The 1963 England rugby union tour of Australasia was the first overseas tour by the England national rugby union team.

Scotland, Ireland and France had preceded England in embarking on short tours to the Southern Hemisphere, and the RFU can be criticised for not having understood that an itinerary of six hard matches including three Test matches in a mere 18 days is somewhat severe, especially when 2 Test matches, against different countries, fall within 4 days at the end of the trip.

Matches
Scores and results list England's points tally first.

Touring party

Manager: J.T.W. Berry
Assistant Manager: M.R. Steele-Bodger
Captain: Mike Weston (Durham City) 16 caps

Full back
Roger Hosen (Northampton) No caps

Three-quarters
F.D. Sykes (Northampton) 2 caps
Malcolm Phillips (Fylde) 20 caps
Mike Weston (Durham City) 16 caps
James Colin Gibson (US Portsmouth) No caps
John Dee (Hartlepool Rovers) 2 caps
John Ranson (Rosslyn Park) No caps

Half-backs
Phil Horrocks-Taylor (Leicester) 4 caps
R.F Read (Harlequins) No caps
Trevor Wintle (St Mary's Hospital) 4 caps
Simon Clarke (Cambridge University) 4 caps

Forwards
Ron Jacobs (Northampton) 22 caps
Phil Judd (Coventry) 5 caps
John E. Highton (US Portsmouth) No caps
Bert Godwin (Coventry) 3 caps
John Thorne (Bristol) 3 caps
John Owen (Coventry) 4 caps
T.A. Pargetter (Coventry) 2 caps
Mike Davis (Torquay Athletic) 3 caps
Budge Rogers (Bedford) 10 caps
David Perry (Bedford) 2 caps
Brian Wightman (Coventry) 3 caps
Vic Marriott (Harlequins) No caps

References

1963 rugby union tours
1963
1963
tour
1963 in New Zealand rugby union
1963 in Australian rugby union